Mont-Bellevue is an arrondissement, or borough, of the city of Sherbrooke, Quebec, Canada. It comprises the former town of Ascot and the southern portion of pre-amalgamation Sherbrooke. The eponymous mountain forms Mont-Bellevue Park in the city centre. The borough is represented by four councillors on the Sherbrooke City Council.

References

External links
Borough of Mont-Bellevue

Boroughs of Sherbrooke

Local government in Quebec